The discography of Audioslave, an American hard rock band, consists of three studio albums, two extended plays (EPs), fourteen singles, two video albums and ten music videos. Formed in Los Angeles, California in 2001, Audioslave was a supergroup featuring former Soundgarden and Temple of the Dog vocalist Chris Cornell and three former members of Rage Against the Machine – guitarist Tom Morello, bassist Tim Commerford and drummer Brad Wilk. Signed to Epic and Interscope Records, the band released its self-titled debut album in November 2002, which peaked at number 7 on the US Billboard 200. Supported by five singles, all of which reached the top ten of the Billboard Mainstream Rock Songs chart, Audioslave was certified triple platinum by the Recording Industry Association of America (RIAA). The band's first video album, also self-titled, was released in 2003 and reached number 5 on the Billboard Top Music Videos chart, receiving a gold certification from the RIAA.

The band returned in 2005 with their second studio album Out of Exile, which topped the Billboard 200 and the Canadian Albums Chart, as well as reaching the top ten of the UK Albums Chart. The album's lead single also reached the top 40 of both the Billboard Hot 100 and the UK Singles Chart. Later in the year the group also released its first live video Live in Cuba, which topped the Billboard Top Music Videos chart and was certified platinum by the RIAA. Audioslave released its third and final studio album Revelations in 2006, which debuted at number 2 on the Billboard 200 and topped the Canadian Albums Chart. The album's lead single "Original Fire" charted in the US, Australia and the UK. Within a year of the album's release, Cornell had announced his departure from Audioslave and the band had broken up. The group reunited for a one-off performance in January 2017, before Cornell was found dead while on tour with Soundgarden in May 2017.

Studio albums

Extended plays

Singles

Other charted songs

Video albums

Music videos

Footnotes

References

External links
Audioslave discography at AllMusic
Audioslave discography at Discogs
Audioslave discography at MusicBrainz

Rock music group discographies
Discographies of American artists
Discography